Estudiotel Alicante (also Riscal) is a skyscraper and hotel in Alicante, Spain. It is located at Poeta Vila y Blanco Street 4 in 03003 postal area near Plaza de los Luceros.

The building was designed by local architect Francisco Muñoz Llorens and completed in 1962. Besides its height, the building is also distinguished by the geometrically designed parapets on its south face. It has 78 hotel rooms.

See also 
 Gran Sol
 El Barco, Alicante

References

Citations

Books

External link

Buildings and structures in Alicante
Skyscraper hotels in Spain
Hotel buildings completed in 1962